Hugh Stowell (3 December 1799 – 8 October 1865) was a Church of England clergyman with a reputation as a "vigorous and inspiring preacher". He was an implacable opponent of Catholic emancipation whose supporters built Christ Church in Salford, Lancashire, for him, where he remained from its consecration in 1831 until his death.

Stowell gained "national notoriety" as a consequence of the Hearne v Stowell libel case brought against him in 1840 by Daniel Hearne, a Catholic priest. Stowell alleged that Hearne had forced one of his parishioners, John O'Hara, to crawl on his hands and knees through a Manchester street as a penance. O'Hara was known to be insane and was not called as a witness, Stowell's defence claiming that whatever a clergyman said in the performance of his duties was not libellous so long as the clergyman believed it to be true. Stowell was found guilty and ordered to pay damages of 40 shillings, a decision that was reversed on appeal.

Publications
 The Passover: and other sermons preached in Christ Church, Salford
 The Importance of the Protestant Controversy; Or the Church of England and the Church of Rome Contrasted; a Lecture [on Deut. Xxxii. 47], ... Being Introductory to a Course of Sermons “On the Errors of the Church of Rome.”
 The Pleasures of Religion; with Other Poems
 Popery the Great Enemy of England
 Course of Lectures on the Creed of Pope Pius IV. and its Tractarian sympathizers. Lecture on the Romish doctrine of Penance
 The Papacy. A Sermon, Delivered in St. James's Church, Preston ... January 23, 1851

References

Citations

Bibliography

1799 births
1865 deaths
19th-century English Anglican priests